Arpad Emmerich Elo ( Élő Árpád Imre; August 25, 1903 – November 5, 1992) was a Hungarian-American physics professor who created the Elo rating system for two-player games such as chess. 

Born in Egyházaskesző, Kingdom of Hungary, he moved to the United States with his parents in 1913. He was a professor of physics at Marquette University in Milwaukee and a chess master. By the 1930s he was the strongest chess player in Milwaukee, then one of the nation's leading chess cities. He won the Wisconsin State Championship eight times, and was the 11th person inducted into the World Chess Hall of Fame.

Death
Elo died in Brookfield, Wisconsin on November 5, 1992.

The Elo rating system

Elo is known for his chess player rating system. The original player rating system was developed in 1950 by Kenneth Harkness, the Business Manager of the United States Chess Federation. By 1960, using the data developed through the Harkness Rating System, Elo developed his own formula which had a sound statistical basis and constituted an improvement on the Harkness System. The new rating system was approved and passed at a meeting of the United States Chess Federation in St. Louis in 1960.

In 1970, FIDE, the World Chess Federation, agreed to adopt the Elo Rating System. From then on until the mid-1980s, Elo himself made the rating calculations.  At the time, the computational task was relatively easy because fewer than 2000 players were rated by FIDE.

FIDE reassigned the task of managing and computing the ratings to others, excluding Elo.  FIDE also added new "Qualification for Rating" rules to its handbook awarding arbitrary ratings (typically in the 2200 range, which is the low end for a chess master) for players who scored at least 50 percent in the games played at selected events, such as named Chess Olympiads.

Books
The Rating of Chess Players, Past and Present (First Edition 1978, Second Edition 1986), Arco.

References

External links

1903 births
1992 deaths
Austro-Hungarian emigrants to the United States
American chess players
Hungarian chess players
20th-century American physicists
20th-century Hungarian physicists
20th-century American mathematicians
Sportspeople from Milwaukee
Chess theoreticians 
Marquette University faculty
American statisticians
20th-century chess players